Eimear McDonnell is a camogie player, winner of an All-Star award in 2005, a Lynchpin award, predecessor of the All Star awards, in 2003, a Texaco award in 2003, and five All Ireland medals in 1999, 2000, 2001, 2003 and 2004. She was previously nominated for an All Star award in 2004.

Family background
She is a niece of Cork football manager Billy Morgan. Her sister Deirdre played on the University of Limerick team that won their second Ashbourne Cup in 2004. Her brother Brian is a well-known GAA journalist.

Career
She played in eight successive All Ireland finals for Tipperary. In 2001, she scored 1-2 in Tipperary’s All-Ireland final win and she was selected as the RTÉ Player of the Match. She scored a goal and had another controversially disallowed in 2002 and was player-of-the-match despite finishing on the losing team in 2003. She had a penalty saved in 2004 when she laid off the match-winning goal for Joanne Ryan.

References

External links
 Profile in Cúl4kidz magazine

Living people
Tipperary camogie players
Year of birth missing (living people)